Krasino is the name of several rural localities in Russia:
Krasino, Arkhangelsk Oblast, a settlement in Novaya Zemlya District of Arkhangelsk Oblast
Krasino, Moscow Oblast, a settlement in Moscow Oblast
Krasino, Smolensk Oblast, a settlement in Smolensk Oblast
Krasino-Uberezhnoye, a settlement in Tula Oblast